Sredneye Babalarovo (Urta Baba) is a rural locality (a selo) in Yakshimbetovsky Selsoviet, Kuyurgazinsky District, Bashkortostan, Russia. The population was 64 as of 2010. There are 4 streets.

Geography 
Sredneye Babalarovo is located 37 km southwest of Yermolayevo (the district's administrative centre) by road. Kuyurgazy is the nearest rural locality.

References 

Rural localities in Kuyurgazinsky District